Bagong Buwan is a 2001 Filipino drama film co-produced and directed by Marilou Diaz-Abaya and written by Diaz-Abaya, Ricky Lee, and Jun Lana. It is about the Muslim rebellion in Mindanao, Philippines and its effect on civilians. It has become one of Marilou Diaz-Abaya's cinematic masterpieces due to making awareness and highlights of a socio-political issue to the cinematic audience.

The film was released on December 25, 2001, as an official entry of the 27th Metro Manila Film Festival and won seven awards including Best Actor to Cesar Montano, Best Child Performer to Jiro Manio, and Best Original Theme Song to Joey Ayala's Walang Hanggang Paalam. Controversially, the film won the Second Best Picture award, this caused an alarm from Cesar Montano who was dismayed from the winning of the said award to Yamashita: The Tiger's Treasure. It received an international release in the United States on July 19, 2002, as part of the New York Asian American International Film Festival  and in Japan on September 15, 2002, as part of the 12th Fukuoka International Film Festival. The film was restored in high definition by ABS-CBN Film Archives and Central Digital Lab in 2015.

Plot
Ahmad (Cesar Montano) belongs to the Moro people . While many of his kind are bent on fighting, thinking that Mindanao is only for the Muslims, Ahmad prefers to live a simple and peaceful life. He works as a doctor in Manila while his wife, Fatima (Amy Austria), and his only son, Ibrahim, stay in Mindanao with his mother, Farida (Caridad Sanchez). Ahmad is shocked and devastated when Fatima breaks the confounding news. Ibrahim was killed by a stray bullet when vigilantes indiscriminately fire at their village. Ahmad goes back to where he came from --- Mindanao.

Ibrahim’s death did not cause Ahmad to stop striving to live a peaceful life, much to the consternation of his brother, Musa (Noni Buencamino). His brother takes an exactly opposite stand. Musa believes in waging a war against all the unbelievers who may impede the Moro’s goal of independence. He even trains his young son, Rashid (Carlo Aquino) to a Muslim warrior’s life.

Ahmad wishes to bring his family to Manila in order to escape the conflict in Mindanao but convinces no one, even his mother. Farida is apparently used to a life of constantly running away from crossfire. His wife, Fatima, wishes to stay where the memory of his son remains. Ahmad is now challenged to continue his life’s vocation as a healer in his war-torn homeland.

One day, the MILF headed by Musa, together with Rashid, bombed a police station near a public marketplace. Francis (Jiro Manio), a young Catholic boy, is separated from his parents during the confusion and follows Rashid. Rashid grudgingly takes Francis with him and introduces him to his co-villagers. Francis goes wherever Ahmad and his people go. Francis and Rashid, at their very young age, find themselves prejudiced against each other. The tribe leader was later slain in a crossfire between MILF and a battalion of soldiers sent to search the missing boy.

Ahmad’s group flees the war by evacuating their village and looking from one place or another for a safe haven in the hope of avoiding crossfire and finding a safe place to live in. Ahmad, in his new role as the leader, discovers the pain and suffering that innocent people have gone, and still, go through just because they find themselves in the middle of a war they never instigated.

Ahmad learns more about his own people. He learns about how the government takes them for granted. He learns about how the Moro, as a people, strive to fight for their rights and liberty. Ahmad also learns that in his veins still runs the blood of a Muslim and offers the ultimate sacrifice. He died in battle when Lt. Ricarte's men fired at Ahmad, killing him and crippling Ricarte.

Near the end, Musa and Rashid joins the rebels, Francis returned to his parents, and Fatima and Farida descended from the mountains to teach the kids what they learned. The two met in Ahmad's grave for a last time before departing, for good.

In the end, one realizes that "nobody really wins in a war. A just peace is better than a just war."

Cast
Cesar Montano as Dr. Ahmad Ibn Ismael
Jericho Rosales as Lt. Ricarte
Amy Austria as Fatima
Caridad Sanchez as Bae Farida
Carlo Aquino as Rashid
Noni Buencamino as Musa
Jiro Manio as Francis delos Santos
Ronnie Lazaro as Datu Ali
Jhong Hilario as Jason
Jodi Santamaria as Dolor

Production

The film was shot in Malaybalay, Bukidnon, Marawi City, Nagcarlan, Laguna and Metro Manila.

Accolades

See also
Legal Wives - First Philippine television drama series that tackles the culture of Filipino Muslims and polygamic marriages

References

Bagong Buwan
Bagong Buwan

External links

2001 films
2000s historical drama films
Philippine historical drama films
Star Cinema films
2001 drama films
Films directed by Marilou Diaz-Abaya